The Gaon Album Chart is a record chart that ranks the best-selling albums and EPs in South Korea. It is part of the Gaon Music Chart which launched in February 2010. The data for the chart is compiled by the Ministry of Culture, Sports and Tourism and the Korean Music Content Industry Association based on weekly and monthly physical albums and digital sales by six major distributors: LOEN Entertainment, S.M. Entertainment, Sony Music Korea, Warner Music Korea, Universal Music and Mnet Media.

Overall, Super Junior's Sexy, Free & Single album was Gaon Album Chart best selling album of 2012, selling 356,431 copies. Super Junior also sold South Korea best-selling album of 2012 with both standard Sexy, Free & Single and repackage SPY album selling a total of 480,622 units overall. The group won Album of The Year at 2012 Mnet Asian Music Awards, Album of The Year (3rd Quarter) at 2nd Gaon Chart Music Awards, Disk Daesang and Disk Bonsang at 27th Golden Disc Awards and Disk Bonsang at 22nd Seoul Music Awards.

Weekly charts

Monthly charts

Notes

References

External links 
 Gaon Charts - Official Website 

2012
Korea, South albums
2012 in South Korean music